Each year the North Dakota Miss Basketball award is given to the person chosen as the best high school girls basketball senior player in the U.S. state of North Dakota.

The award has been given annually since 1984. Winners are chosen by the North Dakota Associated Press Sportscasters and Sportswriters Association (NDAPSSA).

Award winners

Schools with multiple winners

Universities with multiple winners

See also
North Dakota Mr. Basketball

References 

Miss Basketball
Mr. and Miss Basketball awards
Awards established in 1984
Women's sports in North Dakota
Basketball in North Dakota
Miss Basketball
Lists of American sportswomen
Miss Basketball